"Work of Art (Da Vinci)" is a song recorded by Swedish singer Måns Zelmerlöw. It was released on 13 June 2007 as a digital download in Sweden as the second single from his debut studio album Stand by For... (2007). The song was written by Niklas Edberger, Henrik Wikström and Zelmerlöw. It peaked at number 16 on the Swedish singles chart.

Track listing

Chart performance

Weekly charts

Release history

See also
 Leonardo da Vinci

References

2007 songs
Måns Zelmerlöw songs
Songs written by Henrik Wikström
Songs written by Måns Zelmerlöw
Songs written by Niklas Edberger
English-language Swedish songs